Judy Banks (19 June 1935 – 22 January 2022) was an Australian television presenter and actress of stage and screen, singer and pioneering children's TV host. She started her career in musical theatre from the early 1950s and was an early star on Melbourne television.

Life and career
Banks was born in Melbourne, Victoria. She started her career as a stage actress, playing the juvenile leads in many musicals in the early 1950s, including Salad Days, Lock Up Your Daughters and Free As Air. She moved to television with guest roles in In Melbourne Tonight, Saturday Party, Personally Yours, Be My Guest and Musical Cash Box before hosting her own series, Four for the Show, for four years. She was the co-director of TV World, the Australian Museum of Modern Media, alongside her husband. 

Banks was best known as co-presenter of the children's variety program Fredd Bear's Breakfast-A-Go-Go (1969-71) and, later, an afternoon show called Fredd Bear's Super Cartoon Show in 1972. She briefly worked as a presentation announcer for radio. She also had guest starring acting roles in many series, including Homicide, The Flying Doctors and City Homicide. She ran her own talent and media school and also presented a radio program called Sugar and Spice.

Family
Banks was married to TV producer Bob Phillips and was the mother of Australian international relations academic Andrew Phillips.

Filmography

References

External links
 Judy Banks School of Television

1935 births
2022 deaths
Australian television presenters
Australian women television presenters
People from Melbourne